Damas Damar Jati (born 18 October 2000) is an Indonesian professional footballer who plays as a defensive midfielder for Liga 1 club PSIS Semarang.

Club career

PSIS Semarang
He was signed for PSIS Semarang to play in Liga 1 in the 2021 season. Damas made his professional debut on 15 October 2021 in a match against Persik Kediri at the Manahan Stadium, Surakarta.

Career statistics

Club

References

External links
 Damas Damar Jati at Soccerway

2000 births
Living people
People from Semarang
Indonesian footballers
Liga 1 (Indonesia) players
PSIS Semarang players
Association football midfielders
Sportspeople from Central Java